Cassidulina is a genus of foraminifera described in the Treatise Part C. (Loeblich & Tappan, 1964), as having a free, lenticular test, with central boss of clear calcite on either side. Chambers are biserially arranged, enrolled planispirally with a subangular to keeled periphery. The wall is calcareous, hyaline (glassy), optically granular, perforate.  The surface is smooth with a polished appearance.  Sutures are radial to oblique, straight or curved.  The aperture is a narrow arched slip at the base of the apertural face, partly closed by an apertural place. (Loeblich and Tappan 1988)

The taxonomy of Cassidulina is rather stable, and is included in the Cassidulinidae at least as far back as Cushman, 1950.  Related genera include Cassidulinella, Favocassidulina, Globocassidulina, and Buriela.  Cassidulina, itself, is cosmopolitan, with a stratigraphic range extending from the Upper Eocene to recent.

Species 
 Cassidulina albemariensis McCulloch, 1977
 Cassidulina alternans Yabe & Hanzawa, 1925
 Cassidulina asanoi Uchio, 1950
 Cassidulina bradshawi Uchio, 1960
 Cassidulina braziliensis Cushman, 1922
 Cassidulina caledoniana McCulloch, 1981
 Cassidulina carapitana Hedberg, 1937 †
 Cassidulina carinata Silvestri, 1896
 Cassidulina costatula Cushman, 1933
 Cassidulina cretacea Cushman, 1931
 Cassidulina crustosa Saidova, 1975
 Cassidulina curvata Phleger & Parker, 1951
 Cassidulina curvatiformis McCulloch, 1977
 Cassidulina cushmani R.E. & K.C. Stewart, 1930
 Cassidulina deafueraensis McCulloch, 1977
 Cassidulina delicatiformis (McCulloch, 1977)
 Cassidulina detierraensis McCulloch, 1977
 Cassidulina differens McCulloch, 1977
 Cassidulina elegantissima Cushman, 1925
 Cassidulina globosa Hantken, 1865
 Cassidulina hoodensis McCulloch, 1977
 Cassidulina inflatiformis McCulloch, 1977
 Cassidulina insueta Cushman, 1947
 Cassidulina izuensis Aoki, 1967
 Cassidulina kasiwazakiensis Husezima & Maruhasi, 1944
 Cassidulina laevigata d'Orbigny, 1826
 Cassidulina limbata Cushman & Hughes, 1925
 Cassidulina lineocorrugata McCulloch, 1977
 Cassidulina lobulata McCulloch, 1977
 Cassidulina lomitensis Galloway & Wissler, 1927
 Cassidulina margareta Karrer, 1877 †
 Cassidulina marshallana Todd, 1954
 Cassidulina moluccensis Germeraad, 1946
 Cassidulina monicaniformis McCulloch, 1977
 Cassidulina monstruosa Voloshinova, 1952 †
 Cassidulina neoteretis Seidenkrantz, 1995
 Cassidulina norvangi Thalmann, 1952
 Cassidulina obtusa Williamson, 1858
 Cassidulina oshimai Aoki, 1967
 Cassidulina palmerae Bermúdez & Acosta, 1940
 Cassidulina patula Cushman, 1933
 Cassidulina penangensis McCulloch, 1977
 Cassidulina perumbonata Keyzer, 1953
 Cassidulina pilasensis McCulloch, 1977
 Cassidulina planata Saidova, 1975
 Cassidulina planulata McCulloch, 1977
 Cassidulina pulchella d'Orbigny, 1839
 Cassidulina quadrata Cushman & Hughes, 1925
 Cassidulina radiata Chave, 1987
 Cassidulina rarilocula Cushman, 1933
 Cassidulina reniforme Nørvangi, 1945
 Cassidulina seca McCulloch, 1977
 Cassidulina simpsonsbayensis McCulloch, 1977
 Cassidulina spiniferiformis McCulloch, 1977
 Cassidulina spiralis Natland, 1938
 Cassidulina striatostoma Zheng, 1979
 Cassidulina subcalifornica Drooger, 1953
 Cassidulina subcarinata Uchio, 1960
 Cassidulina sublaevigata Hofker, 1956
 Cassidulina sublimbata Asano & Nakamura, 1937
 Cassidulina subtumida Cushman, 1933
 Cassidulina teretis Tappan, 1951
 Cassidulina tortuosa Cushman & Hughes, 1925
 Cassidulina translucens Cushman & Hughes, 1925
 Cassidulina tumida Natland, 1938
 Cassidulina velaensis McCulloch, 1981
 Cassidulina victoriensis Collins, 1974
 Cassidulina vulgata McCulloch, 1977
 Cassidulina wakasaensis Asano & Nakamura, 1937
 Cassidulina weinmanensis McCulloch, 1977
 Cassidulina wordeni McCulloch, 1977
 Cassidulina wrangellensis McCulloch, 1977
 Cassidulina yabei Asano & Nakamura, 1937

References 

 Joseph A. Cushman, 1950. Foraminifera, their classification and economic use. Harvard University Press, Cambridge, Massachusetts. 4th edition, 1950
 Alfred R. Loeblich, Jr. and Helen Tappan, 1964. Sarcodina, chiefy "Thecamoebians" and Foraminiferida. Treatise on Invertebrate Paleontology, Part C, Protista 2.  Geological Society of America and University of Kansas Press, 1964.
 Alfred R. Loeblich, Jr. and Helen Tappan, 1988. Forminiferal Genera and their classification.
Geological Survey of Iran, (e-book) 2005.

External links 
 
 Cassidulina at the Worls Register of Marine Species (WoRMS)

Rotaliida genera
Fossil taxa described in 1826
Extant Eocene first appearances